Heat exchange may refer to:

Heat transfer, an area of engineering concerned with the transfer of thermal energy (heat)
Heat exchanger, a device built for heat transfer from one medium to another
Air conditioner, a device that cools interior air, such as that of a building or vehicle
Heat sink, a device used to absorb energy, typically by using its large mass to raise its temperature slightly or by changing phase
Radiator, a device used to either move heat away from an object or heat an interior space by circulating a fluid through thin metal tubes
Refrigerator, a device used to cool objects or interior spaces
Space heater, a device used to heat spaces, typically interior spaces